Hockey Day may refer one of the following days during the National Hockey League regular season:

 Hockey Day in Canada
 Hockey Day in America
 Hockey Day Minnesota